Rhys Ifans (born Rhys Owain Evans; 22 July 1967) is a Welsh actor and musician. He was the frontman of Welsh rock music bands the Peth and Super Furry Animals. As an actor, he is best known for his roles in Notting Hill (1999), Kevin & Perry Go Large (2000) and Enduring Love (2004) as well as his portrayals of Xenophilius Lovegood in Harry Potter and the Deathly Hallows – Part 1 (2010), the supervillain Lizard in Marc Webb's The Amazing Spider-Man (2012) and the Marvel Cinematic Universe film Spider-Man: No Way Home (2021), and Grigori Rasputin in The King's Man (2021). Other roles include Hector DeJean in the Epix thriller series Berlin Station, Mycroft Holmes in the CBS series Elementary, and Ser Otto Hightower in the HBO television series House of the Dragon.

Early life
Ifans was born Rhys Owain Evans in Haverfordwest on 22 July 1967, the son of nursery school teacher Beti-Wyn (née Davies) and primary school teacher Eurwyn Evans. His younger brother, Llŷr Ifans, is also an actor. He grew up in Ruthin, where he received his primary education at Ysgol Pentrecelyn and was raised speaking Welsh as his first language. He attended Ysgol Maes Garmon, a Welsh medium secondary school in Mold, where he took his O levels and A levels. He attended acting classes at Theatr Clwyd. After leaving school, he presented Welsh-language television programmes on S4C. He studied acting at the Guildhall School of Music and Drama in London, where he graduated in 1997.

Career

Stage
Ifans' early stage work included Hamlet at Theatr Clwyd, A Midsummer Night's Dream at the Regent's Park Theatre, and Under Milk Wood and Volpone at the National Theatre. He appeared at the Donmar Warehouse in 2003's Accidental Death of an Anarchist.  In 2006, he returned to the London stage in Michael Grandage's production of Don Juan in Soho at the Donmar Warehouse. In 2016, Ifans played Fool alongside Glenda Jackson in Deborah Warner's production of King Lear, at The Old Vic. He returned to The Old Vic to play Ebenezer Scrooge in Matthew Warchus' production of A Christmas Carol (adapted by Jack Thorne) in 2017 and in 2018 returned to the National Theatre to play King Berenger in Patrick Marber's new adaptation of Eugene Ionesco's Exit the King. Ifans was given the role of Atticus Finch in Aaron Sorkin's To Kill A Mockingbird to begin at London's Gielgud Theatre on 21 May 2020. The play was delayed due to the COVID-19 pandemic but was rescheduled for May 2021. The role of Atticus Finch was later given to Rafe Spall due to scheduling conflicts.

Television
Ifans appeared in many Welsh-language television programmes before embarking on his film career, including the comedy show , as well as performing at the National Theatre, London and the Royal Exchange, Manchester. In 1990, he presented Sdwnsh (Welsh for "Mash"), an anarchic children's quiz programme. A total of 31 fifteen-minute programmes were broadcast on Welsh-language TV channel S4C.

In 2000, He narrated the children's animated series Sali Mali for S4C. In 2004, Ifans performance as Peter Cook in the TV film Not Only But Always won him the BAFTA Best Actor at the |2005 British Academy Television Awards.

In 2005, Ifans made a guest appearance for the rock band Oasis in the video for their single "The Importance of Being Idle" (where he mimed to Noel Gallagher's vocals), for which he accepted their award for Video of the Year at the 2006 NME Awards. He has also appeared in the music videos for "God! Show Me Magic" and "Hometown Unicorn" by Super Furry Animals, "Mulder and Scully" by Catatonia, and "Mama Told Me Not to Come" by Tom Jones with Stereophonics.

In 2008, he appeared in "Six Days One June", one of three episodes of the TV series The Last Word Monologues, written by Hugo Blick and broadcast on BBC Two. He played a lonely Welsh farmer trying to free himself from a domineering mother.

From 2016 to 2019, Ifans portrayed hard-nosed American CIA case officer Hector DeJean in the U.S. pay-cable Epix network espionage thriller drama series Berlin Station, which was filmed on location in Berlin.

Ifans plays Otto Hightower in the Game of Thrones prequel, House of the Dragon, which premiered 21 August 2022.

Feature films
Following his role as Jeremy Lewis in the Swansea-based movie Twin Town (1997) alongside his brother Llŷr, Ifans gained international exposure in his role as the slovenly housemate Spike in the British film Notting Hill (1999). Reportedly, in preparation for the role, Ifans did not wash himself or brush his teeth. He played Adrian, the pompous eldest brother in Little Nicky (2000). Other film roles include: Eyeball Paul in Kevin & Perry Go Large (2000), Nigel in The Replacements (2000), Iki in The 51st State (2001), William Dobbin in Vanity Fair (2004), and Vladis Grutas in Hannibal Rising (2007). He played Jed Parry in the 2004 film version of Ian McEwan's Enduring Love, and the lead role in Danny Deckchair (2003) as Danny Morgan.

Ifans revealed in March 2009 that he was to appear in Harry Potter and the Deathly Hallows – Part 1 (2010). He played Xenophillius Lovegood, editor of the wizarding magazine The Quibbler and father of the eccentric Luna Lovegood. In the same interview, he announced that he would play the title role in the film Mr. Nice, based on the life of the drug smuggler Howard Marks. He played Nemo Nobody's father in Mr. Nobody. He played a villain in Nanny McPhee and the Big Bang.

On 11 October 2010 Associated Press confirmed that Ifans would portray the villain in the Spider-Man reboot film The Amazing Spider-Man. The villain was revealed as the Curt Connors / Lizard a few days later, and the film was released in July 2012. In 2015, Ifans starred in She's Funny That Way, directed by Peter Bogdanovich.

Ifans also starred in Steven Bernstein's Last Call, which was released theatrically, followed an extremely long delay, in the US on 25 November 2020. It is a surrealistic biopic, which recreates the life of Welsh poet Dylan Thomas through flashbacks during the famous drinking binge at the White Horse Tavern in New York City which ended fatally during the fall of 1953. The film stars Ifans as Thomas alongside John Malkovich, Rodrigo Santoro, Romola Garai, Zosia Mamet, and Tony Hale.

On 16 November 2021 it was revealed, through the film's official trailer, that Ifans would reprise his role as Lizard from The Amazing Spider-Man in the Marvel Cinematic Universe film Spider-Man: No Way Home, to be released on 17 December. Later it was revealed that Ifans was not actually present on set and only lent his voice for the character created through digital means, with his human form at the end of the film being from archival footage from The Amazing Spider-Man.

Ifans also appeared as Grigori Rasputin in the spy film The King's Man, which was released in December 2021.

Music
Ifans was briefly lead vocalist of the rock band Super Furry Animals before they released any records.

Since 2007, Ifans has sung with the psychedelic rock band The Peth ("peth" is Welsh for "thing"), featuring Super Furry Animals' Dafydd Ieuan, which played a number of concert dates in south Wales and in London in the autumn of 2008. In 2009 the band supported Oasis at a concert in the Millennium Stadium in Cardiff.

Charity work
In September 2012, Ifans became a patron of the Welsh-language Wikipedia, together with then Archbishop of Wales Barry Morgan.

In 2017, Ifans partnered with Shelter Cymru in a campaign called "7 Ways You Can End Homelessness". He also in 2017 supported the community purchase of Tafarn Sinc, a pub in his native Pembrokeshire facing closure.

Personal life
Ifans lives in London. He dated actress Sienna Miller in 2008 and dated English actress Anna Friel from 2011 to 2014.

Controversies 
In 2002, Ifans caused some controversy in the British media for his alleged support of Meibion Glyndŵr, a militant Welsh nationalist group which burnt down more than 100 empty holiday homes in Wales owned by English people during the 1980s. This was mainly due to an interview Mariella Frostrup conducted with him for The Observer in which he said, "Welsh-speaking communities are under threat more than at any other time in history because of house prices. [...] Communities that have been there for centuries are essentially becoming holiday villages. Young people are forced to leave because there's no work and the young people that are left can't afford to live there. That's a crime."

During the 2011 San Diego Comic-Con, Ifans was arrested for misdemeanour battery by the San Diego Police Department after allegedly pushing a guard prior to speaking on a guest panel. The District Attorney's office announced that Ifans would not be charged due to lack of evidence.

Filmography

Film

Television

Music videos

Honours, awards and nominations
On 16 July 2007, he received an Honorary Fellowship of Bangor University, for services to the film industry.

References

External links

 
 

1967 births
20th-century Welsh male actors
21st-century Welsh male actors
Living people
Cool Cymru
People from Haverfordwest
Alumni of the Guildhall School of Music and Drama
Best Actor BAFTA Award (television) winners
People associated with Bangor University
People from Ruthin
Super Furry Animals members
Welsh male film actors
Welsh male stage actors
Welsh male television actors
Welsh male voice actors
Welsh-speaking actors